The following is a list of Florida State Seminoles men's basketball head coaches. There have been seven head coaches of the Seminoles in their 76-season history.

Florida State's current head coach is Leonard Hamilton. He was hired as the Seminoles' head coach in March 2002, replacing Steve Robinson, who was fired after the 2001–02 season.

References

Florida State

Florida State Seminoles men's basketball coaches